Mirabilis is a Latin adjective meaning "amazing, wondrous, remarkable", and is used to refer to:
 Annus mirabilis, a Latin phrase meaning "wonderful year" or "year of wonders" (or "year of miracles")
 Anorexia mirabilis, religious fasting to the point of starvation, particularly of women and girls of the Middle Ages
 RV Mirabilis, a ship
 Mirabilis, a genus of herbaceous perennial plants
 W. mirabilis, a species of plant 
 L. mirabilis, a species of plant 
 Mirabilis (band), an ethereal/neo-classical band
 Mirabilis (company), an internet company, owned by Digital Sky Technologies, that produced ICQ
 Mirabilis (novel), a novel by Susann Cokal
 Mirabilis (album), album by British vocal group Mediaeval Baebes